Weimersheimer Bach is a river of Bavaria, Germany. It flows into the Swabian Rezat near Weißenburg in Bayern.

See also 
List of rivers of Bavaria

Rivers of Bavaria
Weißenburg-Gunzenhausen
Rivers of Germany